Vladimir Merkulov may refer to: 

 Vladimir Merkulov (pilot) (1922-2003), Soviet flying ace
 Vladimir Merkulov (athlete) (born 1989), Russian professional football player